Dalanzadgad Airport   is a public airport located in Dalanzadgad, the capital of Ömnögovi Province in Mongolia.

Although Dalanzadgad Airport is classified as an international airport there are no scheduled flights outside Mongolia.

Airlines and destinations

See also 

 List of airports in Mongolia
 List of airlines of Mongolia

References

External links 
 world aero data Dalanzadgad

Airports in Mongolia